Hjallerup is a small town in Northern Jutland, Denmark with a population of 4,235 (2022), located in Hjallerup parish. It is the second largest town in Brønderslev Municipality and belongs to the North Denmark Region.

The town is known for the annual Hjallerup Market - a horse market held during the first weekend of June every year - which is also a meeting place for buskers and vagabonds.

Gallery

References

Cities and towns in the North Jutland Region
Brønderslev Municipality